The Northern Star Award, formerly known as the Lou Marsh Trophy, the Lou Marsh Memorial Trophy and Lou Marsh Award, is a trophy that is awarded annually to Canada's top athlete, professional or amateur. It is awarded by a panel of journalists, with the vote taking place in December. It was first awarded in 1936. It was named in honour of Lou Marsh, a prominent Canadian athlete, referee, and former sports editor of the Toronto Star. The trophy is made of black marble and stands around 75 centimetres high. The words "With Pick and Shovel" (the name of Marsh's long-running Star column) appear above the engraved names of the winners. The voting panel consists of sports media voters from across the country including representatives from the Toronto Star, The Canadian Press, FAN590, The Globe and Mail, CBC, Rogers Sportsnet, CTV/TSN, La Presse and the National Post.

The award has been awarded 79 times and won by 62 individual athletes and three pairs; in the voting for the 2018 Lou Marsh Trophy, it was decided that in the future pairs should not be eligible for the trophy, thereby disqualifying Tessa Virtue / Scott Moir from consideration. Wayne Gretzky won the trophy four times, more than any other athlete, while Barbara Ann Scott won the trophy three times, more than any other woman. It was not awarded from 1942 to 1944 due to World War II.

There were ties between different athletes in 1978 and 2020 with soccer player Alphonso Davies & American football player Laurent Duvernay-Tardif as the most recent co-winners. In 1982, Rick Hansen was the auxiliary award of special merit winner (he won nine gold medals at the Pan-American Wheelchair Games) alongside first-time winner Wayne Gretzky, "who was the unanimous choice of the selection committee".

On November 16, 2022, it was announced that the award would be renamed from the Lou Marsh Award to the Northern Star Award "after concerns were raised about racist language used by Marsh, who died in 1936, during his years of sportswriting."

Winners

Key
 * = Also won the Lionel Conacher Award as Canadian male athlete of the year
 ^ = Also won the Bobbie Rosenfeld Award as Canadian female athlete of the year

Winners by sport
Not included in this table are Terry Fox and Laurent Duvernay-Tardif, as their respective wins were based on their social contributions, rather than their participation in a sport in general. Fox was awarded for the Marathon of Hope; Duvernay-Tardif was awarded for opting out of playing in the 2020 NFL season for the Kansas City Chiefs after winning Super Bowl LIV to work as an orderly at a long-term care facility during the COVID-19 pandemic in Quebec.

See also

 List of members of Canada's Sports Hall of Fame
 Canadian Olympic Hall of Fame
 Lionel Conacher Award
 Bobbie Rosenfeld Award
 Canadian Press Team of the Year Award
 Velma Springstead Trophy
 Sports in Canada
 Athlete of the Year

Notes

References

General
 Bob Ferguson, Who's Who in Canadian Sport, Fitzhenry and Whiteside Ltd., 2005, p. 532 (through 2004).
 
 
  
Specific

External links

The Lou Marsh Legacy: Honouring Canada's Top Athletes in the Virtual Museum of Canada

Canadian sports trophies and awards
Can
Most valuable player awards
Awards established in 1936
1936 establishments in Canada